The Minister of Justice is a senior member of the Constitutional Government of East Timor heading the Ministry of Justice.

Functions
The Minister has the power and the duty:

Falling within those powers and duties are responsibilities such as overseeing the recruitment of judges, prosecutors, and public defenders. 

Where the Minister is in charge of the subject matter of a government statute, the Minister is also required, together with the Prime Minister, to sign the statute.

Incumbent
He is assisted by José Edmundo Caetano, Deputy Minister of Justice, and Mário Ximenes, Secretary of State for Land and Property.

List of Ministers 
The following individuals have been appointed as Minister of Justice:

References

Footnote

Notes

External links

  – official site  

Justice